Golin (also Gollum, Gumine) is a Papuan language of Papua New Guinea.

Phonology

Vowels

The consonants  can also be syllabic.

Consonant

 are treated as single consonants by Bunn & Bunn (1970), but as combinations of  + ,  +  by Evans et al. (2005).

Tone
Golin is a tonal language, distinguishing high ([˧˥]), mid ([˨˧]), and low ([˨˩]) tone. The high tone is marked by an acute accent and the low tone by a grave accent, while the mid tone is left unmarked. Examples:
 High: mú [mu˧˥] 'type of snake'; wí [wi˧˥] 'scream (man)'
 Mid: mu [mu˨˧] 'type of bamboo'; wi [wi˨˧] 'coming from the same ethnic group'
 Low: mù [mu˨˩] 'sound of river'; wì [wi˨˩] 'cut (verb)'

Pronouns
Golin is notable for having a small pronominal paradigm. There are two basic pronouns:
ná first person
í second person

There is no number distinction and no true third person pronoun. In fact, third person pronouns in Golin are in fact compounds derived from ‘man’ plus inín ‘self’:
yalíni ‘he’ < yál ‘man’ + inín ‘self’
abalíni ‘she’ < abál ‘woman’ + inín ‘self’

References

Chimbu–Wahgi languages
Languages of Simbu Province
Tonal languages
Subject–object–verb languages